This is the complete list of Olympic medalists in weightlifting.

Current program

Men

Bantamweight
–56 kg (1948–1968)
52–56 kg (1972–1992)
54–59 kg (1996)
–56 kg (2000–2016)
–61 kg (2020–)

Lightweight
60–67.5 kg (1920–1992)
64–70 kg (1996)
62–69 kg (2000–2016)
67–73 kg (2020)
61–73 kg (2024-)

Middleweight
67.5–75 kg (1920–1992)
70–76 kg (1996)
69–77 kg (2000–2016)
73–81 kg (2020)
73–89 kg (2024–)

Heavyweight
+82.5 kg (1920–1948)
+90 kg (1952–1968)
90–110 kg (1972–1976)
100–110 kg (1980–1992)
99–108 kg (1996)
94–105 kg (2000–2016)
96–109 kg (2020)
89–102 kg (2024–)

Super heavyweight
+110 kg (1972–1992)
+108 kg (1996)
+105 kg (2000–2016)
+109 kg (2020)
+102 kg (2024–)

Women

Flyweight
48 kg (2000–2016)
49 kg (2020–)

Lightweight
58 kg (2000–2016)
59 kg (2020–)

Light heavyweight
69 kg (2000–2016)
76 kg (2020)
71 kg (2024–)

Heavyweight
75 kg (2000–2016)
87 kg (2020–)
81 kg (2024–)

Super heavyweight
+75 kg (2000–2016)
+87 kg (2020)
+81 kg (2024–)

Discontinued events

Men

One hand lift

Two hand lift

All-around dumbbell contest

Flyweight
–52 kg (1972–1992)
–54 kg (1996)

Featherweight
–60 kg (1920–1936)
56–60 kg (1948–1992)
59–64 kg (1996)
56–62 kg (2000–2016)
61–67 kg (2020)

Light heavyweight
75–82.5 kg (1920–1992)
76–83 kg (1996)
77–85 kg (2000–2016)

First heavyweight
90–100 kg (1980–1992)
91–99 kg (1996)

Middle heavyweight
82.5 kg–90 kg (1952–1992)
83–91 kg (1996)
85–94 kg (2000–2016)
81–96 kg (2020)

Women

Featherweight
53 kg (2000–2016)
55 kg (2020)

Middleweight
63 kg (2000–2016)
64 kg (2020)

See also
List of Asian Games medalists in weightlifting
Weightlifting at the 1906 Intercalated Games — these Intercalated Games are no longer regarded as official Games by the International Olympic Committee

References
International Olympic Committee results database

Weightlifting

Olympic
Lists of weightlifters
medalists